The 1983 IAAF World Women's Road Race Championships was the inaugural edition of the annual international road running competition organised by the International Amateur Athletics Federation (IAAF). The competition was hosted by the United States on December 3, 1983 in San Diego, California and featured one race only: a 10k run for women. There were individual and team awards available, with the national team rankings being decided by the combined score of a team's three best athletes. Countries with fewer than three finishers were not ranked.

Wendy Sly of Great Britain was the winner of the race in a time of 32:23 minutes. She was followed by two Americans, Betty Springs and Lesley Welch. The United States won the team competition, with the third American runner Ellen Hart Peña also placing in the top ten. Canada, led by fourth-placer Nancy Tinari, was second in the team competition and Monica Joyce led the Irish women to the team bronze medal. A total of 66 women from 18 countries entered the race and 62 finished the distance. Nine nations entered more than three athletes and eight of these reached the team rankings with three finishing athletes (England being the exception). The United States had the largest contingent, with 16 entrants. The Soviet Union's Raisa Sadreydinova was a prominent entrant, having set a 10,000 metres world record earlier that year, but she failed to finish.

The competition proved a development in global level competitions for women in long-distance running: the launch of this race was a push by the IAAF to the International Olympic Committee to gain Olympic recognition of this distance for women. A women's race was subsequently added for the 10,000 metres at the Olympics in 1988, following on from the first Olympic marathon for women in 1984.

Results

Individual

Team

References

1983
IAAF World Women's Road Race Championships
IAAF World Women's Road Race Championships
IAAF World Women's Road Race Championships
IAAF World Women's Road Race Championships
Foot races in California
International track and field competitions hosted by the United States